Yesterday is a temporal construct of the relative past; literally of the day before the current day (today), or figuratively of earlier periods or times, often but not always within living memory.

Learning and language
The concepts of "yesterday", "today" and "tomorrow" are among the first relative time concepts acquired by infants. In language a distinctive noun or adverb for "yesterday" is present in most but not all languages, though languages with ambiguity in vocabulary also have other ways to distinguish the immediate past and immediate future. "Yesterday" is also a relative term and concept in grammar and syntax.

Yesterday is an abstract concept in the sense that events that occurred in the past do not exist in the present reality, though their consequences persist.

Some languages have a hesternal tense: a dedicated grammatical form for events of the previous day.

References

External links

Past
Days